KEWS (104.7 FM) was a radio station licensed to Sac City, Iowa, United States. The station was owned by Radioactive, LLC.

History
The Federal Communications Commission (FCC) issued a construction permit for the station on March 9, 2005. The station was assigned the call sign WJLL on February 15, 2008, and, on March 10, 2008, changed its call sign to KJLN. The station was granted its license to cover on June 24, 2008, but later went silent. On January 15, 2012, the station changed its call sign to KEWS.

Radioactive surrendered KEWS' license to the FCC on April 20, 2015; the FCC cancelled the license the next day.

References

External links

EWS
Radio stations established in 2008
Defunct radio stations in the United States
Radio stations disestablished in 2015
2008 establishments in Iowa
2015 disestablishments in Iowa
Defunct mass media in Iowa